James Thomas Foley (July 9, 1910 – August 17, 1990) was a United States district judge of the United States District Court for the Northern District of New York from 1949 to 1990 and Chief Judge from 1963 to 1980.

Education and career

Born on July 9, 1910, in Troy, New York, Foley received an Artium Baccalaureus degree in 1931 from Fordham University and a Bachelor of Laws in 1934 from Albany Law School. He entered private practice in Troy from 1935 to 1942. He was Secretary to Justice William H. Murray of the Supreme Court of the State of New York from 1939 to 1942 and from 1946 to 1949. He served in the United States Naval Reserve from 1942 to 1945.

Federal judicial service

Foley was nominated by President Harry S. Truman on January 13, 1949, to a seat on the United States District Court for the Northern District of New York vacated by Judge Edward S. Kampf. He was confirmed by the United States Senate on January 31, 1949, and received his commission on February 2, 1949. He served as Chief Judge from 1963 to 1980. He assumed senior status on June 30, 1980. His service terminated on August 17, 1990, due to his death in Albany, New York.

References

Sources
 

1910 births
Judges of the United States District Court for the Northern District of New York
United States district court judges appointed by Harry S. Truman
20th-century American judges
Fordham University alumni
Albany Law School alumni
1990 deaths
United States Navy officers
20th-century American lawyers